Stephen Warren may refer to:

 Stephen Warren (politician) (1815-1898), member of the Wisconsin State Assembly
 Stephen Warren (astronomer), British astronomer
 Stephen Warren (geneticist) (born 1953), American geneticist